Ralph M. Anderson (September 2, 1935 – November 27, 1960) was an American college and professional football player. An offensive end, he played college football at Santa Monica College and Los Angeles State University, and played professionally in the American Football League for the Los Angeles Chargers in 1960. His 44 receptions were good enough to lead the Chargers for the season. He played one game with the Winnipeg Blue Bombers of the Canadian Football League in 1959.

Death
Anderson died in Los Angeles on November 27, 1960, apparently due to diabetic complications. After going to the movies with his girlfriend and his teammate Ron Botchan, Anderson spent the night at the home of his girlfriend. She found him unresponsive the next morning and efforts to revive him were unsuccessful. Anderson had missed a game earlier in the 1960 season due to diabetic problems.

References

See also
List of American Football League players

1936 births
1960 deaths
American football wide receivers
Chicago Bears players
Deaths from diabetes
Los Angeles Chargers players
Cal State Los Angeles Diablos football players
Santa Monica Corsairs football players
Players of American football from Long Beach, California